Dasyloricaria paucisquama is a species of catfish in the family Loricariidae. It is native to South America, where it occurs in the upper and middle Magdalena River basin in Colombia. The species reaches 20.3 cm (8 inches) in standard length. Its specific epithet, paucisquama, is derived from Latin and refers to the low number of central abdominal plates typical of the species.

References 

Loricariidae
Fish described in 2016
Catfish of South America
Fish of Colombia